USS Quileute (YTB–540), later YTM-540, was a United States Navy harbor tug in service from 1945 to ca. 1974.

Quileute was laid down 17 February 1945 by the Consolidated Shipbuilding Corporation at Morris Heights, the Bronx, New York, and launched on 14 May 1945. She was placed in service on 16 October 1945 with the 3rd Naval District at New York City as the large harbor tug USS Quileute (YTB-540).

Quileute began active duty for the 1st Naval District at Boston, Massachusetts, in March 1946. In February 1962, she was reclassified as a medium harbor tug and redesignated YTM–540. She remained active with the 1st Naval District into at least 1970.

[1970-1974]

Quileute was sold for scrapping on 1 March 1974.

References
 
 
 NavSource Online: Service Ship Photo Archive Quileute (YTM-540) ex Quileute (YTB-540) (1945 - 1962)

 

Tugs of the United States Navy
Cold War auxiliary ships of the United States
Ships built in Morris Heights, Bronx
1945 ships